Dae Hyeonseok (died 894) was the 13th king of Balhae who reigned from 871 to 894. Dae Geonhwang was his grandfather. During his reign, he sent tribute to tang dynasty china three times. His son was Dae Wihae.

See also
List of Korean monarchs
History of Korea

References

Balhae rulers
894 deaths
9th-century rulers in Asia